Phil Burke (born 1982) is a Canadian film, television and stage actor, best known for his role as Irish immigrant Mickey McGinnes on the AMC television series, Hell on Wheels.

Career 
Burke appeared in the 2015 film Dirty Weekend. He also has appeared in a comedic role as thoughtless, hapless husband named "Dual-Bag" in series of television commercials titled "The Doghouse" for retailer JCPenney. He also starred as Cooper in an episode of Chicago P.D.

Filmography

Film

Television

References

External links
 

Living people
1982 births
Canadian male television actors
Canadian male film actors
Irish male television actors
Irish male film actors
Male actors from Toronto